Christian Felipe Ocaña Téllez (born March 18, 1992, in Arriaga, Chiapas), known as Christian Ocaña, is a former Mexican professional association football (soccer) player who last played for Cafetaleros de Chiapas.

External links
 

Liga MX players
Living people
Cafetaleros de Chiapas footballers
Pioneros de Cancún footballers
C.D. Veracruz footballers
Murciélagos FC footballers
Loros UdeC footballers
1992 births
Footballers from Chiapas
Mexican footballers
Association football defenders